Dear Friend may refer to:

 Dear Friend (TV series), Philippine television drama.
 Dear Friend (1949 film), Austrian film by Rudolf Steinboeck
 Dear Friend (2022 film), Indian film
"Dear Friend", a song written by Jerry Bock & Sheldon Harnick released in 1964
"Dear Friend", a song by Paul McCartney from Wild Life
"Dear Friend", a song by Ronnie Milsap from Out Where the Bright Lights Are Glowing
"Dear Friend", a 1990 song by Akina Nakamori
"Dear Friend", a 2006 song by Sowelu
"Dear Friend", a song by Union from The Blue Room